The European Parliament and Council Directive 2000/36/EC is an EU Directive relating to cocoa and chocolate products. Most notably, this directive allows chocolate to contain up to 5% non-cocoa vegetable fats. 

The Belgian Ministry of Economic Affairs has attempted to resist the effects of this directive by introducing the AMBAO certification scheme, which certified that chocolate carrying the AMBAO mark was produced without vegetable fat substitution.

References

External links 
 

Chocolate
European Union directives
European Union food law